List of settlements and estates in the United States Virgin Islands, sorted by island.

Saint Croix

Saint Thomas

Saint John

See also
 Districts and sub-districts of the United States Virgin Islands
 Islands of U.S. Virgin Islands
 Minor islands of the United States Virgin Islands

 
Virgin Islands
Settlements
United States Virgin Islands